This page lists Japan-related articles.

Alphabetical indices
Index of Japan-related articles (0–9) 
Index of Japan-related articles (A) 
Index of Japan-related articles (B) 
Index of Japan-related articles (C) 
Index of Japan-related articles (D) 
Index of Japan-related articles (E) 
Index of Japan-related articles (F) 
Index of Japan-related articles (G) 
Index of Japan-related articles (H) 
Index of Japan-related articles (I) 
Index of Japan-related articles (J) 
Index of Japan-related articles (K) 
Index of Japan-related articles (L) 
Index of Japan-related articles (M) 
Index of Japan-related articles (N) 
Index of Japan-related articles (O) 
Index of Japan-related articles (P) 
Index of Japan-related articles (Q–R) 
Index of Japan-related articles (S) 
Index of Japan-related articles (T) 
Index of Japan-related articles (U–V) 
Index of Japan-related articles (W–X) 
Index of Japan-related articles (Y–Z)

Navigation
List of cities in Japan
List of Japanese people
List of records of Japan

See also
Outline of Japan 
Lists of country-related topics

Japan
 
Japan